Lectionary 301 (Gregory-Aland), designated by siglum ℓ 301 (in the Gregory-Aland numbering) is a Greek manuscript of the New Testament, on parchment. Palaeographically it has been assigned to the 13th century. The manuscript is lacunose.

Description 

The original codex contained lessons from the Gospel of John, Matthew, and Luke (Evangelistarium), on 334 parchment leaves. The leaves are measured.

The text is written in Greek minuscule letters, in two columns per page, 19 lines per page. The manuscript contains weekday Gospel lessons for Church reading from Easter to Pentecost and Saturday/Sunday Gospel lessons for the other weeks.

It contains music notes.

History 

Gregory dated the manuscript to the 12th century. It is presently assigned by the INTF to the 13th century.

Albert L. Long, brought the manuscript in 1869 from Constantinople to America.

The manuscript was added to the list of New Testament manuscripts by Caspar René Gregory (number 301e). Scrivener did not list this manuscript.

The text of the manuscript was examined by Charles Fremont Sitterly.

Currently the codex is housed at Drew University (Ms. 2) in Madison, New Jersey.

See also 

 List of New Testament lectionaries
 Biblical manuscript
 Textual criticism
 Lectionary 300

Notes and references

Bibliography 

 
 K. Clark, Descriptive catalogue of Greek New Testament manuscripts in America (1937), pp. 36-38.
 Charles Fremont Sitterly, Praxis in Manuscripts of the Greek Testament (New York, 1898), IX.

Greek New Testament lectionaries
13th-century biblical manuscripts